Trigonopterus oblongus is a weevil found in Papua. It was notable as the first known instance of a biological screw joint. The biological screw joint is just  in size. This discovery was made by Alexander Riedel of the State Museum of Natural History Karlsruhe and by Thomas van de Kamp of the Karlsruhe Institute of Technology .

References

oblongus
Beetles of Asia
Insects of Indonesia
Beetles described in 1885
Taxa named by Francis Polkinghorne Pascoe